Mark Erno Hauber is an American ornithologist and Endowed Professor at the University of Illinois Urbana-Champaign. His research considers the development of avian recognition systems.

Early life and education 
Hauber was born and raised in Hungary. He has said that he always wanted to become an ornithologist. He attended high school in Italy, before moving to the United States for college. Hauber was an undergraduate student at Yale University, where he majored in organismal biology. He started focusing on birds, and the differences between the brains of different species. He worked toward his doctorate at the Cornell University, where he studied brood parasitic cowbirds. After graduating, Hauber moved to the University of California, Berkeley as a postdoctoral research fellow.

Research and career 
In 2003, Hauber moved to New Zealand, where he joined the faculty at the University of Auckland. Whilst in New Zealand, he studied psychology, and earned a Doctor of Science on avian recognition systems. His doctoral thesis for this degree was entitled Cognitive ecology of avian recognition systems : studies of brood parasitic and parental taxa. He returned to the United States in 2009, where he joined the faculty at City University of New York. Here he oversaw the biopsychology and behavioural neuroscience program.

Hauber was appointed to the faculty at the University of Illinois Urbana-Champaign in 2017. He established the Cowbird Laboratory, which investigates the evolution of recognition systems. For example, Hauber has studied the color and shape of eggs that "host" birds will accept in their nests. He has shown that pointy eggs are more likely to survive being in a bird's cliffside nest. Hauber focused his research on parasitic birds and the impact of climate change. He showed that in unstable climates, distributing eggs amongst a variety of different nests made a species more resilient. Hauber studies the birds that live in tree farms in East Urbana, Illinois.

Selected publications

Books 
The Book of Eggs

Personal life 
Hauber came out as gay after moving to the United States. He is a member of the grassroots organization 500 Queer Scientists.

References 

Living people
Cornell University alumni
Yale University alumni
University of Illinois Urbana-Champaign faculty
Academic staff of the University of Auckland
City University of New York faculty
Year of birth missing (living people)
American ornithologists
Hungarian ornithologists